Izam (stylized as IZAM, born 23 April 1972 (1976), in Fuchū, Tokyo) is a Japanese musician, tarento, and actor. He is best known as the singer of the visual kei rock band Shazna. He graduated from Tokyo Metropolitan Matsugatani High School. He is represented with Sun Music Production. He is the president of the Benibara Usagi-dan. He is a special lecturer at Japanese Newart College.

Discography

Singles

Albums

Participation works

Filmography

Appearances

Director

Acting works

TV programmes

TV dramas

Direct-to-video

Advertisements

Stage

Films

Voice acting

Anime films

Notes

References

External links
 
 – Ameba Blog 
 

Japanese male rock singers
Japanese male actors
Japanese lyricists
Visual kei musicians
Singers from Tokyo
People from Fuchū, Tokyo
1972 births
Living people
21st-century Japanese singers
21st-century Japanese male singers